Stephen J. J. Sader was a professional football player for the Philadelphia Eagles of the National Football League. However, he was also a member of the "Steagles", a team that was the result of a temporary merger between the Eagles and Pittsburgh Steelers due to the league-wide manning shortages in 1943 brought on by World War II. Prior to his career in the NFL, Sader was a standout local sandlot player with no professional experience who played fullback and was the kicker for Bill Morrow's Shamrocks's, a South Philadelphia sandlot team. He also excelled as a catcher in hardball and played for Morrow's Baseball Shamrocks, Manoa, and the Wilmington Clippers.  Additionally, he had a tryout with the Brooklyn Dodgers and they were willing to sign him, but the Eagles did not allow him a release from his contract to play both sports with their overlapping seasons.

He had a contract for the 1944 season and was put on waivers to a new team being started up in Boston by Kate Smith's husband.  He unfortunately had a chipped bone in his kicking foot and toward the end of the season was diagnosed with Hodgkin's Disease. He died in May, 1946 leaving a wife, Mary Agnes Sader (Reardon ) and a son, Stephen M. Sader as survivors.

References
"The Steagles"—Saved Pro Football During World War II''

Players of American football from Pennsylvania
Steagles players and personnel
1946 deaths
Philadelphia Eagles players